The FIS Ski Flying World Ski Championships 1975 took place in Bad Mitterndorf, Austria between 14–16 March 1975.

Individual

Medal table

References
 FIS Ski flying World Championships 1975 results. - accessed 25 November 2009.

FIS Ski Flying World Championships
1975 in ski jumping
1975 in Austrian sport
Ski jumping competitions in Austria
International sports competitions hosted by Austria
Sport in Styria
March 1975 sports events in Europe